The FIFA Beach Soccer World Cup finals are matches which are the last of the competition, and the results determine which country's team is declared world champions. If after 36 minutes of regular play the score is a draw, an additional 3-minute period of play, called extra time, is added. If such a game is still tied after extra time it is decided by kicks from the penalty mark, commonly called a penalty shootout, under the sudden death rules. The winning penalty shoot-out team are then declared champions. The 2011 final between Brazil and Russia was the highest ever scoring final with 20 goals in all. The lowest scoring final was in 1998, when Brazil beat Uruguay by just 3 goals to nil.

In the fifteen world cups, only one has ever gone past normal time being the first FIFA controlled world cup, the 2005 FIFA Beach Soccer World Cup, when France and Portugal were drawn 3–3 after 36 minutes. The game eventually went to penalties, with Eric Cantona's side winning 1–0.

In the fifteen tournaments held, thirty-eight nations have appeared at least once. Of these, ten have made it to the final match, and three have won. With thirteen titles, Brazil are clearly the most successful and powerful nation who compete in the World Cup and also one of two nations to have participated in every World Cup finals tournament. The other champions are Portugal, who won in 2001 and, as previously stated, France, who won in 2005.

Finals
  Match was won on a penalty shootout

Beach Soccer World Championship Finals

FIFA Beach Soccer World Cup Finals

Results by nation

Results by confederation

See also
FIFA Beach Soccer World Cup
National team appearances in the FIFA Beach Soccer World Cup

References

finals